Thimistokles Magoulas (born 21 July 1927) is a Greek former sailor who competed in the 1964 Summer Olympics.

References

External links
 

1927 births
Possibly living people
Greek male sailors (sport)
Olympic sailors of Greece
Sailors at the 1964 Summer Olympics – Dragon